Mrittupuri: Kill Zone is a film about a Bangladeshi gangster crime war in Australia. This film is the directorial debut Zayed Rizwan, produced by Buddy Safi and Arijit Barua Shawon under their newly founded studio, Baz Films. This film marks the first Bangladeshi movie to be filmed and set entirely in Australia. The script was written by Faisal Roddy and the screenplay was conducted by Susmita Biswas. Nagib Hawk was responsible for the film's music composition, and Igor Breakenback, renowned Hollywood action director choreographed many of the action scenes. The first look teaser of the movie was released on 20 February 2016.

Plot 
Sydney is a dream city for many immigrants, but also it is an ideal place for many international crime lords. Gangsters from Bangladesh, China, Lebanon, Russia have all moved to Australia, to take a piece of the pie, and try to build empire. Among them is the rising Bangladeshi gang Double R. Rajan Rahman, the kingpin of Bangladeshi gang is not happy with the way his elder son, Rajib Rahman and his crime associate Raja, run the business. The situation comes to a head after the timely death of Irish Mob boss’ son Jimmy, which prompts Rajib to leave the country. Raja maintains low profile during this period, and in the process falls in love with bar dancer Layla. Upon Rajib's return, he warns Raja not to get involved with Layla, as he perceives Layla to be his own property. Raja manages to divert Rajib's mind away, with plans to do business with Lengra Kashem, a mercenary from Bangladesh. Rajib and Sabbir, his youngest brother, meet Lengra and promise him the East coast territory, leading to their business partnership to become a  booming new empire. Eventually, Rahman and his crew fall through on their deal, and remove Lengra from the partnership. Lengra decides to avenge this deception, waiting for the right time to strike.

Cast 
 Arifin Shuvoo as Raja
 Prosun Azad as Layla
 Saifullah Akber Sadi as Rajib Rahman
 Taskeen Rahman as Lengra Kashem
 Imran Sakib as himself

Production

Development 
In September 2015, Baz Films, an Australian-based film production company had announced the movie Bangla Boyz which later in November 2015 was renamed to Mrittupuri - Kill Zone. Initially, it was supposed to be produced by Screentime Entertainment, with Buddy Safi as Co Producer and Arijit Barua Shawon as Line Producer. But due to some creative differences, Screentime and Baz parted their ways and Buddy Safi had stepped in Producer's shoes while Arijit Barua Shawon was appointed as Co Producer.

Pre-production 
The pre-production of the movie started in November 2013; director Zayed Rizwan developed the storyline and appointed Faisal Roddy to write the script. Actor Arifin Shuvoo was roped in for Raja character and Taskeen Rahman was chosen for Lengra Kashem character. In May 2015, Susmita Biswas was appointed to do the final draft of the script. During that period the rest of the casts were selected and Saifullah Sadi was roped in for Rajib Rahman's character. in September 2015, Prosun Azad was roped in for the lead actress role. Nagib Hawk, the renowned composer from United States has done the compositions of the movie. The principal photography of the movie was supposed to start in December 2015 but there was a change of producers and Buddy Safi and Arijit Barua Shawon had stepped into the producers’ shoes. The principal photography was rescheduled for September 2016. In June 2016, famous action director from Hollywood Igor Breakenback was appointed as the action director. I gor designed some unique action sequences which haven't been showcased in Dhallywood before.

Filming 
The filming has commenced in September 2017 and had a 21 days of shoot. All the major scenes were shot during this time. In March 2018 the filming will resume and on 30 March the camera will close. The movie was shot in some exotic locations in Sydney, Australia. Director Zayed Rizwan wanted to use real locations instead of sets, which made tasks difficult for the unit but at the end of the day, Zayed said it was all worth the obstacles. He mentioned, "I want Bangladeshi audience to experience the international feel of the movie, hence I decided to use real locations for which, I am really grateful to Australian government for their support." The climax action was shot in Middle Head Fort in Mosman. Zayed added, "In Bangladesh, people really liked MI - 2 climax action locations, so I thought why not provide the audience similar kind of experience with their favourite actor Arifin Shuvoo." One club song of the movie was shot in a real strip club Sefton Playhouse. Producer Arijit Barua said, "Filming in a real club is very difficult, there are management factors, crowd factors, size factors, usage limitations, but we have successfully shot the song in one day". One particular outdoor scene was shot in a private boat harbour in Balmain, this is the first time any feature film was shot in that particular harbour, producer Buddy Safi added, "When Zayed explained the scene, he was ready to film that scene in an ordinary location, but I insisted to film that scene in a lucrative and high profile location. Although it was a very difficult location to arrange and I had to go extra miles to obtain the permission, it was all worth the troubles, specially when I saw the end result of that scene, I am sure the audience in Bangladesh will fall in love with that location."

Post-production 
The post production of the movie has already started and the first look teaser will be released in February 2016. The film will have a distinct Hollywood style look which will make it stand out among all the other releases in Dhallywood.

Music 
The music of the film is composed by Nagib Hawk with lyrics penned by Susmita Biswas.

Soundtrack 
The album Mrittupuri (titled same as the movie) is the official release of the soundtrack of the
2016 action film Mrittupuri. The album is composed and conceptualized by Nagib Hawk, the
music director of the film, and released under the banner Jadughor and BAZ Films. Initially, the
song titled Dhanak Dhanak was presented to Director Zayed Rizwan as the prototype song to set
the vibe of the soundtrack. Most of the lyrics were written by writer Susmita Biswas Sathi, with the
exception of the title song "Mrittupuri", which is written by Rasel, and the English counterpart of
Dolna, written by Gsifz.

Production 
Working closely with director Zayed Rizwan and lyricist Susmita Biswas Sathi, the music director
decided to integrate a fresh, new sound into the film while keeping hints of traditional elements.
For example, Choom De, a playfully seductive song sung by Kona (which was originally sung by
Tanjina Islam) contains instruments from South Asia—such as morsing, santoor, harmonium,
duff, khol—while complemented by Western Electronic sounds. The songs Dhanak Dhanak and
Dolna are both energetic and smooth club-bangers, introducing Tanjina Islam and Gsifz, two of
the freshest and unique voices in industry. Khola Khola Prem, an energetic EDM romantic song,
is sung by Amid and Poonam. Both artists brought a suave and smooth vibe to this rebellious
song, which was later incorporated in the theme music of the film. The soft classical side of
Naumi mixed with Shawon Gaanwala's sentimental vocals made the highly expressive romantic
song—Shokhiya—possible. Last but not least, the most contemplative song in the soundtrack is a
solo piece by Naumi, called Phirbo Ami. Most of the songs were recorded in Bengal Studios
(Dhaka), Dream Desk Studios (Dhaka), and Hot Beats Studios (Atlanta).

Track listing

Release 
The film has not been released as of April 2022.

References

 http://www.sydneybashi-bangla.com/cul-group/Mrittupuri-Cinema-launching-photos-1.htm - Press Release

Further reading

External links
 http://www.bmdb.com.bd/movie/379/

Bangladeshi crime drama films
Bengali-language Bangladeshi films